The Yale-Cady Octagon House and Yale Lock Factory Site is a private residence at 7550 North Main Street in Newport, New York, comprising an historic octagonal  house and the adjoining site of the lock factory of Linus Yale, Sr. and his son Linus Yale, Jr., the inventor of the cylinder lock and the founders of the Yale Lock company. Linus Yale, Sr., built the house in 1849 as a gift for his daughter, Chlothilda, who had married Ira L. Cady on July 8, 1839.  Currently, the house is a private residence and the Yale Lock Factory is in ruins.

It was listed on the National Register of Historic Places in 2007.

It is a property with several interesting details, including overhanging eaves with pairs of curvilinear brackets, cupola and bay windows which are typical of the Italianate style.

See also 
 Yale & Valor

References

Houses on the National Register of Historic Places in New York (state)
Octagon houses in New York (state)
Houses completed in 1849
Houses in Herkimer County, New York
1849 establishments in New York (state)
National Register of Historic Places in Herkimer County, New York
Industrial buildings and structures on the National Register of Historic Places in New York (state)
Locksmithing